Shalamov is a Russian male surname, its feminine counterpart is Shalamova. Notable people with the surname include:

Varlam Shalamov (1907–1982), Russian writer, journalist and poet
Yelena Shalamova (born 1982), Russian rhythmic gymnast

Russian-language surnames